Nigel Edgar Horton (born 13 April 1948) is a former England international rugby union player. He toured New Zealand in 1977 with the British and Irish Lions and at the time played club rugby for Moseley Rugby Football Club and St Claude rugby club in France

Notes

1948 births
Living people
English rugby union players
British & Irish Lions rugby union players from England
England international rugby union players
Moseley Rugby Football Club players
Rugby union players from Birmingham, West Midlands
Rugby union locks